Maqsood Raza (born 5 December 1966) is a Pakistani former cricketer. He played 44 first-class and 26 List A matches for several domestic teams in Pakistan between 1983 and 2003.

See also
 List of Pakistan Automobiles Corporation cricketers

References

External links
 

1966 births
Living people
Pakistani cricketers
Lahore cricketers
Pakistan Automobiles Corporation cricketers
Sheikhupura cricketers
Water and Power Development Authority cricketers
Cricketers from Lahore